Moonbear (born Kabrina Adams; 1994) is an actress, skateboarder, DJ, and vlogger. Moonbear starred as Ruby in the 2018 film Skate Kitchen, and played Honeybear in the HBO TV series Betty from 2020 until the series' cancelation in 2021.

References

External links

1994 births
American skateboarders
Female skateboarders
Living people
African-American skateboarders
African-American actresses
African-American DJs
African-American women musicians
21st-century African-American sportspeople
21st-century African-American women